Morning amongst the Coniston Fells, Cumberland, is a painting by J. M. W. Turner (23 April 1775 - 19 December 1851), painted c. 1798. It depicts the Old Man of Coniston, Cumbria, England.

In the catalogue of the Royal Academy from 1798, when verses were allowed for the first time, Turner included four lines from Paradise Lost, Book V:"Ye mists and exhalations that now rise

"From hill or streaming[sic] lake, dusky or gray,

"Till the sun paints your fleecy skirts with gold,

"In honour to the world's great Author, rise."

References

Paintings by J. M. W. Turner